Vehicular combat games (also known as just vehicular combat or car combat) are a sub-genre of vehicle simulation video games where the primary objectives of gameplay include vehicles armed with weapons attempting to destroy vehicles controlled by the CPU or by opposing players. The genre normally features a variety of different vehicles available for play, each with its own strengths, weaknesses, and special attack abilities. Players may also unlock hidden vehicles by completing certain in-game tasks. Games may include racing themes, but they are generally secondary to the action.

Gameplay
Vehicular combat games normally follow a simple play pattern; the player must defeat increasing numbers of not very skilled enemies before facing off against a final, super-powerful, boss character. Vehicular combat games differ from traditional racing games both in the combat aspect and in the general lack of any set path for players to follow, instead allowing them to explore each level at their leisure.
The complexity and strategy required to complete games vary, from the careful resource maintenance and intense story-driven plotlines of the Interstate '76 series to straightforward smashups like WWE Crush Hour. Often the primary plot will involve a contest or competition of some sort, encouraging the various characters to fight and destroy one another to obtain a reward. The Twisted Metal has been attributed as the first "true" vehicular combat game, without cartoony graphics as seen in kart racing games.

Subgenres

Car

Futuristic racing
Note: Also covers Anti-gravity combat racing games.
 Fire and Forget (1988)
 Fire and Forget II (1990)
 Deathtrack (1989)
 S.T.U.N. Runner (1989)
 F-Zero series (1990 debut)
 Battle Cars (1993)
 Hi-Octane (1995)
 Wipeout series (1995 debut)
 Assault Rigs (1996)
 Jet Moto series (1996 debut)
 DethKarz (1998)
 Psybadek (1998)
 Fatal Inertia (2007)
 Death Track: Resurrection (2008)
 BallisticNG (2018)
 Pacer (video game) (2020)

Aircraft

 Airfix Dogfighter
 Altitude
 Diddy Kong Racing
 M.A.C.H.
 Mach Storm
 Plane Crazy
 SkyDrift
 Slipstream 5000
 Sonic & All-Stars Racing Transformed
 War Thunder
 World of Warplanes

Boat, ship and submarine
{{columns-list|colwidth=30em|
 AquaNox series
 Blood Wake
 Critical Depth
 Dead In The Water
 Microcosm
 Silent Hunter series
 Silent Service and Silent Service II
 TigerShark
 War Thunder
 Wave Race series
 World of Warships
 Akella'''s PT Boats series
}}

Tank

Motorcycle

Space vehicle

Multi-vehicular
(List of games in which players use more than one vehicle type during gameplay)

Mecha
This subgenre of vehicular combat involves mech robots, or mecha, as the vehicle for combat. For most mech games, they are played in either first-person or third-person view style. Other games are based on popular Anime television shows such as the various Gundam series, Robotech, and Evangelion. Also, games with a mech theme are featured in RPG games such as Xenosaga and the Front Mission series.

Kart racers with battle modes
Battle modes for kart racing games are deathmatch battles influenced by the characters, go-karts and weapons used in the mode. The Mario Kart series demonstrates this kind of mode in its previous installments.

Mario Kart series
 Super Mario Kart Mario Kart 64 Mario Kart: Super Circuit Mario Kart: Double Dash Mario Kart DS Mario Kart Wii Mario Kart 7 Mario Kart 8 Mario Kart 8 Deluxe Mario Kart TourCrash kart series
 Crash Team Racing Crash Nitro Kart Crash Tag Team Racing Crash Team Racing Nitro-FueledOther kart racers with battle modes
 Cel Damage Charinko Hero Cocoto Kart Racer Diddy Kong Racing Diddy Kong Racing DS Freaky Flyers Jak X: Combat Racing LittleBigPlanet Karting Looney Tunes: Space Race Muppet RaceMania Pac-Man World Rally R.C. Pro-Am Sonic & All-Stars Racing Transformed Sonic & Sega All-Stars Racing Speed Punks Team Sonic Racing Wacky Races Wacky Wheels''

Notes and references

 
Video game genres
Video game lists by genre
Video game terminology